Olepa kakatii is a moth of the family Erebidae first described by Orhant in 2000. It is found in north-eastern India and Assam.

References

Spilosomina
Moths described in 2000